Sitovo Municipality is a small municipality (obshtina) in Silistra Province, Northeastern Bulgaria, located along the right bank of Danube river in the Danubian Plain in the area of the South Dobrudzha geographical region. It is named after its administrative centre - the village of Sitovo.

The main road II-21 crosses the area centrally, from east to west, connecting the province centre of Silistra with the city of Ruse.

Settlements 

Sitovo Municipality includes the following 12 places all of them villages:

Demography 
The following table shows the change of the population during the last four decades.

Ethnic groups 
Ethnic Bulgarians constitute the plurality in Sitovo Municipality. Turks form the second largest ethnic group and Roma people form the third largest ethnic group.

Religion
According to the latest Bulgarian census of 2011, the religious composition, among those who answered the optional question on religious identification, was the following:

Most Bulgarians are Orthodox Christians, while most Turks and Roma people are Muslim.

See also
Provinces of Bulgaria
Municipalities of Bulgaria
List of cities and towns in Bulgaria

References

External links
 Official website 

Municipalities in Silistra Province